The Newcastle Local Municipality council consists of sixty-seven members elected by mixed-member proportional representation. Thirty-four councillors are elected by first-past-the-post voting in thirty-four wards, while the remaining thirty-three are chosen from party lists so that the total number of party representatives is proportional to the number of votes received. In the election of 3 August 2016 the African National Congress (ANC) won a majority of forty-one seats on the council.

Results 
The following table shows the composition of the council after past elections.

December 2000 election

The following table shows the results of the 2000 election.

March 2006 election

The following table shows the results of the 2006 election.

May 2011 election

The following table shows the results of the 2011 election.

August 2016 election

The following table shows the results of the 2016 election.

August 2016 to November 2021 by-elections
In a by-election held on 5 April 2017, a ward previously held by the ANC was won by an independent candidate. Council composition was reconfigured as seen below:

November 2021 election

The following table shows the results of the 2021 election.

The IFP took control of the municipality by entering into agreement with the DA, Team Sugar and other parties.

By-elections from November 2021
The following by-elections were held to fill vacant ward seats in the period since the election in November 2021.

References

Newcastle
Elections in KwaZulu-Natal
Newcastle Local Municipality